
Carl Schoenhof (c. 1843 – 1911) was a bookseller and publisher in Boston, Massachusetts, in the 19th century. He specialized in foreign books. Born in Carlsruhe, Germany, he attended University of Heidelberg. He moved to the U. States around 1864. Shortly thereafter he worked for Boston publishers DeVries, Ibarra & Co., and took over the business in 1870. His business ventures included Schoenhof & Moeller (c. 1870–1878, with Fanny Moeller), Cupples & Schoenhof (c. 1891), and Schoenhof Book Co. (ca.1890s).

Henry James approved of Schoenhof & Moeller, describing it in 1878 as "a vastly better shop than any of the kind in London." Around 1889, "Mr. Schoenhof [was] the general agent for the United States for Hachette & Co.'s (London and Paris) publications for the study of foreign languages ... [and] for Henry Holt & Co.'s (New York) publications. ... [He also sold] Steiger & Co.'s, Wm. R. Jenkins', Geo. R. Lockwood & Son's, MacMillan's, Appleton's, Barnes' publications in foreign languages." Schoenhof's shop was located near the corner of Tremont and Winter Streets: at no.40 Winter St. (1875–1876), no.146 Tremont (1880–1881), no.144 Tremont (1887–1889), and no.128 Tremont (1902–1911). In 1893 he "sold out his interest to two of his employees, who continue[d] the business under the firm-name of Castor & Co."

Schoenhof's brother, Jacob Schoenhof, was an authority on economics, and served as U.S. consul to England during the Cleveland administration.

See also
 List of booksellers in Boston

References

Further reading

Published by Schoenhof & Moeller
 Racine. Esther-Athalie. 1873 Google books

Published by Carl Schoenhof
 Karl Julius Ploetz, J.Noeroth. Easy and practical French grammar, 17th ed. 1880. Google books
 Jean de La Fontaine. Fables. London and Paris: Hachette; Boston: Schoenhof, 1886 Google books
 Wilhelm Bernhardt. German-English vocabulary to both volumes of "Deutsches Sprach- und Lesebuch." 1887. Google books
 Wilhelm Bernhardt, ed. Freudvoll und Leidvoll: short stories by such noted writers of our day as Emil Peschkau, Ernst von Wildenbruch, Heinrich Seidel, Rudolf Baumbach, Helene Stökl, and Helene von Götzendorff-Grabowski, 3rd ed. 1894 Google books

Published by Cupples & Schoenhof
 Edwy Wells Foster. Man: the story of his advent, life and development in the earth world and his continued life and progression in the spirit world, with a description in allegory of his principal aids and counsellors. 1900. Google books

1840s births
1911 deaths
Businesspeople from Boston
19th century in Boston
Economic history of Boston
Financial District, Boston
Companies based in Boston
American publishers (people)
Bookstores in Boston
19th-century American businesspeople